Birth is a 2004 American drama film directed by Jonathan Glazer and starring Nicole Kidman, Lauren Bacall, Danny Huston, Anne Heche, and Cameron Bright. The film follows Anna, who becomes convinced that her dead husband Sean is reincarnated as a ten-year-old boy.

Distributed by New Line Cinema, the film polarized critics upon release and grossed $23.9 million against its $20 million budget.

Plot
Sean and Anna are a married couple living in New York City. While scenes of Central Park are shown on screen, Sean is heard lecturing to an unseen audience, explaining that he does not believe in reincarnation. After the lecture he goes jogging, collapses, and dies. Ten years later, Anna has accepted a marriage proposal from her boyfriend, Joseph.

When Clifford, Sean's brother, arrives at Anna's engagement party, his wife Clara excuses herself, saying she forgot to wrap Anna's gift. Instead, she buys a replacement after hurriedly burying the original gift while a young boy secretly looks on.

At a party for Anna's mother, the boy, who has followed Clara, claims to be Anna's deceased husband, Sean, and warns her not to marry Joseph. At first Anna dismisses the boy's claim. When Anna receives a letter from him the next day warning her not to marry Joseph she realizes the boy truly believes he is her reincarnated husband.

That night Anna and Joseph discuss the letter. Since the building watchman seems to know the boy and that his name is Sean, Joseph calls to get more information. When Sean answers the phone, Joseph rushes downstairs to confront him. He takes him to Sean's father and the three of them order Sean to leave Anna alone. Sean refuses to recant his story and Anna watches Sean collapse in his father's arms.

Sean leaves a message on Anna's answering machine, which her mother overhears. That day at lunch, Anna's mother mentions that Sean wants to meet Anna in the park and that she will know whereabouts. Anna hurries to Central Park and finds Sean waiting in the spot where her husband died. He offers to submit to questioning.

Anna's brother-in-law Bob, a doctor, talks to Sean, recording his responses on tape. Sean answers all the questions, even giving intimate details of Anna and Sean's sex life. Sean is brought to Anna's by his mother and he is able to identify parts of the apartment. Everyone except Anna remains doubtful. Anna's family become worried, particularly her sister Laura, who treats Sean with contempt.

When Anna misses an appointment with her fiancé to spend time with Sean, Joseph begins feeling worried, not merely about the boy but about Anna's odd behavior. His jealousy is made plain when he physically attacks Sean. When Sean runs out, Anna follows him and Sean kisses her on the lips.

Anna seems convinced by the boy's story and asks Clara and Clifford to meet him. Clara encounters Sean at the door and asks him to visit her later. When he visits he brings a backpack full of Anna's love letters to Sean. This package was Clara's spiteful engagement gift, which the boy had secretly unearthed and read the night of the party. Clara had been Sean's lover before his death, and he gave the letters to her unopened as proof of his love. Clara had been jealous that Sean would not leave Anna, but at the last moment abandoned her plan to give Anna the letters. When Clara points out to Sean that if he were really a reincarnation he would have come to her first, Sean runs out, confused.

When Anna finds Sean, she suggests they run away and marry when he is of legal age. He tells Anna that since he loves her he can not be the reincarnated Sean.

Anna apologizes to Joseph, and they are married at the beach. Sean writes a long letter apologizing to Anna, wondering why he had the delusion of being her husband. Anna wades into the sea in anguish after the ceremony. Joseph gradually pulls her back to the shore and whispers into her ear.

Cast

Production
Director Jonathan Glazer was interested in making a film about "the idea of eternal love" and a "mystery of the heart". While writing the script, he was not interested in making a ghost story or a "paranormal piece". He envisioned a fairy tale structure early on. The initial idea for the film came to him one day when he was in his kitchen: "There's this little kid and he tells a woman he's her dead husband – and he's ten years old." Glazer went to Paris to discuss the idea with French screenwriter Jean-Claude Carrière at his producer's recommendation. Carrière ended up helping Glazer with the story and acted as a script consultant. The director spent eight months going back and forth to Paris every weekend turning one paragraph into three acts. The script went through 21 drafts as Glazer and co-screenwriter Milo Addica worked on the story. With only a few weeks before principal photography was to begin, the two writers decided to refocus the entire film. Originally, the script was about the boy and they changed it to be about the woman instead. "We aimed to make something robust in which every question leads to another," said Carrière. "I'm not a Buddhist and I don't believe in reincarnation; I don't think I could do a film about it if I did. I was more interested in the idea of eternal love. I wanted to make a mystery, the mystery of the heart."

Actress Nicole Kidman read the screenplay and wanted to do the film when she found out that Glazer was directing, as she loved his previous film, Sexy Beast. She approached the director about doing the film. At first, he resisted because he felt that "her celebrity is so everywhere that I thought it could only hurt the delicate nature of this character". However, he met with Kidman and realized that "she was ready to inhabit the role". The more he talked to Kidman about her character, he would rewrite the script on weekends, tailoring it specifically for her. To show Anna in mourning both externally and internally, Glazer gave her short hair, spare wardrobe and short, clipped speech. The director explained Anna's appearance as "somebody who had sort of let all glamor go and sexuality go". Kidman said that Glazer instructed her to do small, personal reactions. She found the character to be all-consuming so that she could not separate herself from the role. To research for the role, Kidman spoke to two friends who had lost their fathers and they talked about how it still affected them years after.

Addica and Glazer often wrote scenes the day before they were shot, giving them to the actors on the actual day they were shooting.

Reception

Box office
Birth was ranked 12th on its opening weekend, garnering US$1,705,577 from 550 theaters. The worldwide box office earnings total was US$23,925,492, with US$5,095,038 in the United States (US) and US$18,830,454 in markets outside of the US.

Critical reception
Birth debuted at the 2004 Venice Film Festival where its first press screening was greeted with widely reported booing and catcalls. Glazer responded, "People are a bit polarised by it, which is healthy".

The critics's consensus for Birth at review aggregator Rotten Tomatoes reads: "A well-mounted production is undermined by a muddled, absurd storyline of questionable taste." On the website, 39% of 147 reviews are classified as "fresh" (positive), and the average rating is 5.10/10. According to Metacritic, which compiled 38 reviews and calculated a weighted average score of 51 out of 100, the film received "mixed or average reviews". In his review for Newsweek, David Ansen wrote, "the script is hooey. Birth is ridiculous, and oddly unforgettable". Michael O'Sullivan, in his review for The Washington Post, wrote, "What I'm not so fond of is the cop-out ultimately taken by the filmmakers, who can't seem to follow through on their promisingly metaphysical premise (let alone the theme of obsessive love), electing instead to eliminate all ambiguity". In his review for the New York Daily News, Jack Mathews called the film, "corny, plodding, implausible and – on occasion – seriously creepy".

However, Roger Ebert gave the film three-and-a-half stars out of four and compared it to Rosemary's Baby saying, "Birth is less sensational and more ominous, and also more intriguing because instead of going for quick thrills, it explores what might really happen if a 10-year-old turned up and said what Sean says". In his review for The New York Times, A.O. Scott praised Nicole Kidman's performance: "Without Ms. Kidman's brilliantly nuanced performance, Birth might feel arch, chilly and a little sadistic, but she gives herself so completely to the role that the film becomes both spellbinding and heartbreaking, a delicate chamber piece with the large, troubled heart of an opera." Birth was placed at 96 on Slant Magazine's best films of the 2000s. Writing in The Guardian in August 2010, film critic David Thomson included the film in his list of '10 lost works of genius'.

Controversy
The film generated controversy due to a scene wherein Kidman shares a bath with Bright, both apparently naked. In fact, Bright was never naked and the two were never even in the same room during the filming of the bath scene apart from one camera shot, and when this shot happened both wore special clothes that were not visible to the camera. Glazer insists that the scene is not erotic or exploitative. "I can imagine that, before people see it, they might think it was salacious. But I knew it was never going to be that."

At a press conference at the Venice Film Festival, Kidman addressed the controversy of her character kissing a boy: "It wasn't that I wanted to make a film where I kiss a 10-year-old boy. I wanted to make a film where you understand love." Further controversy occurred at the festival when a journalist described Kidman as a "screen legend", to which her co-star Lauren Bacall replied, "She is a beginner". Kidman downplayed Bacall's remarks and said, "I certainly don't feel like a big star in Hollywood".

Complaints of the film's "cop-out" ending are questioned by Roger Ebert in his review, who notes: "There seem to be two possible explanations for what finally happens, but neither one is consistent with all of the facts."

Accolades

References

External links
 
 
 

2004 drama films
2004 films
2000s mystery drama films
2000s psychological drama films
American mystery drama films
American psychological drama films
Films about reincarnation
Films directed by Jonathan Glazer
Films scored by Alexandre Desplat
Films set in New York (state)
Films with screenplays by Jean-Claude Carrière
Films shot in New York City
Films about grieving
2000s English-language films
2000s American films
New Line Cinema films